Agdistis falkovitshi is a moth of the family Pterophoridae. It is found in Turkmenistan, Russia (including the Caucasus and Daghestan) and Kazakhstan.

References

Moths described in 1986
Agdistinae